Akrab (also known as Aqyrap (Akrab, اكراب; , Akrabskiy) is a town in Aktobe Region, west Kazakhstan.

References

Aktobe Region
Cities and towns in Kazakhstan